On 4 November 2008 an official Mexican Secretariat of the Interior aircraft crashed in central Mexico City at around 18:45 local time. There were sixteen fatalities—all nine people on board and seven people on the ground. The plane, a Learjet 45, was carrying Mexican Secretary of the Interior Juan Camilo Mouriño.

The plane crashed in rush-hour traffic close to the intersection of Paseo de la Reforma and the Anillo Periférico, in the Las Lomas business district. During its approach to Mexico City International Airport, the plane followed a Boeing 767 too closely and encountered wake turbulence which caused it to invert into a nose-down position. The pilots were able to reduce the angle of descent but due to excessive speed and insufficient altitude were unable to regain control of the aircraft. The plane crashed into a building, exploding on impact and killing 16 people.

Details

The Secretariat of the Interior-owned Learjet 45 (registration XC-VMC) left Ponciano Arriaga International Airport in San Luis Potosí and was  short of landing at Mexico City International Airport when it crashed. The crash occurred at 18:45 in the middle of rush-hour traffic of the Las Lomas business district, causing an explosion whose flames "reached higher than the buildings". According to Secretary of Communications and Transport Luis Téllez, there were no survivors. Téllez also stated that the crash appeared to be an accident.

The crash set multiple cars and a newsstand on fire and injured at least 40 people. Body parts were reported to be scattered around the wreckage.

Deaths
All 9 people on board and a further 7 people on the ground were killed. Among the dead were Secretary of the Interior Juan Camilo Mouriño, top aide to President Felipe Calderón, and José Luis Santiago Vasconcelos, former assistant attorney general.

Government response 

After the crash, President Calderón addressed the nation live on national television. He spoke of Mouriño as one of his closest friends and collaborators and conveyed his condolences to the family. He stated that Mouriño was a man who always fought to make Mexico a better country and he guaranteed the nation that there would be an investigation into the causes behind the plane crash. Calderón encouraged Mexican men and women to continue fighting for a better country no matter how difficult or painful any event may be.

Marcelo Ebrard, Head of Government of the Federal District, also conveyed his condolences to Mouriño's family assured that Mexico City's government would issue a statement to the nation regarding the issue. Ebrard later said that the Mexico City government would give financial aid to all of the injured receiving medical care, irrespective of whether they had been admitted to private or public hospitals. He also said that the local authorities had handed over all recordings taken by surveillance video cameras to the federal attorney general, along with all witness accounts that local police gathered.

Several other political figures made statements regarding the crash, including various senators from the Institutional Revolutionary Party and Germán Martínez, leader of the ruling National Action Party. A group of senators from different political parties asked the Attorney General of Mexico to investigate the accident.

Results of investigation 
The jet's black boxes were sent to the United States for analysis. Information gathered from 38 minutes of cabin conversations, along with video footage from a security camera on top of the Omega Office Building, provided evidence for an official statement by the Mexican government that the crash was the result of pilot error. The Learjet was ruled to have been flying too close to a Boeing 767-300ER operated by Mexicana and as a result suffered violent wake turbulence caused by the larger jet.

Investigations into the accident discovered several issues with the Mexican government's use of private contractors as pilots of government aircraft.

Several key elements of the accident emerged during the investigation:
 Pilot Martín Olíva and co-pilot Álvaro Sánchez were not certified to operate the Learjet 45. The investigation concluded that both pilots had received fraudulent certifications: Captain Olíva lied about the number of training flights he had made, and had issues on the few training flights he did complete, while Captain Sánchez lied about being a Learjet 45 instructor. Both men had taken advantage of a corrupt system to get false training documents and some unsigned Learjet 45 certification forms from their flight schools. These revelations led Mexican authorities to suspend the licences of both flight schools.
 The descent profile showed that the improperly trained pilots approached the airport with an inconsistent descent angle. The plane descended rapidly and then leveled off in a stepped approach to the airport. The plane did not slow down to the required speed dictated by the air traffic controller, which brought the plane closer to the Mexicana 767-300.
Further, their in-flight conversations were more of the nature of people driving a car, not of trained pilots following a proper flight plan.
 The flight crew waited over a minute to follow the order from air traffic control to reduce their speed.
The accident happened during peak hours at the airport with heavy air traffic, which called into question the handling and scheduling of flight plans for top government officials.
 The accident happened just at the point where aircraft entering Mexico City traveling on a 170° course (south-southeast) make a sharp left turn to align with the runways of Benito Juárez International Airport at 53° (northeast). When the Learjet reached the turning point, too close behind the Mexicana 767-300, and making a steep descent that dropped it through the violent wake turbulence, it caused the plane to invert into a nose-down attitude. At this point, the plane was within  of the ground, limiting the room to enact a recovery.
 The weather at the time of the accident was calm, which sustained the wake turbulence.
 Due to the flight crew being unqualified for the plane, when faced with the conditions regarding the airspeed, inverted nose-down position, and insufficient altitude, they were unable to regain control of the plane.

Dramatization
The accident and subsequent investigation were featured in Season 14 – Episode 8 of documentary series Mayday. The episode was titled "Inner City Carnage" in the United Kingdom and Australia and "Accident or Assassination" in the United States and Canada.

There has been controversy and conspiracy theories due to the nature of the crash and whether if it had any relation to the drug-trafficking world (suggesting it was crashed on purpose) and, relating it to the corruption within governmental institutions. One uses as evidence the fact that a helicopter, with registration XA-JSL flew a mere 600m from the Learjet that day according to the Secretary of Communications and Transportation and Luis Téllez, without any problems whatsoever from the wake turbulence.

See also
Air Caribbean Flight 309
 Aeroflot Flight 593
United Airlines Flight 2885
2011 Lokomotiv Yaroslavl plane crash, an accident where pilots who did not complete training made many mistakes.
American Airlines Flight 587, an accident where poor training caused the pilot to overreact to wake turbulence from a Boeing 747 that had taken off ahead of them.
Tatarstan Airlines Flight 363, an accident in which the captain used fake credentials to get his license and both pilots being poorly trained.

References

External links 
 Press conference transcript of final report 
 Final report of crash (Archive) 
  

2008 in Mexico
Accidents and incidents involving the Learjet 45 family
Aviation accidents and incidents in 2008
Aviation accidents and incidents in Mexico
History of Mexico City
November 2008 events in Mexico
Aviation accidents and incidents caused by wake turbulence
Paseo de la Reforma
Disasters in Mexico City
2008 disasters in Mexico